Kleinia scottii is a species of flowering plant in the family Asteraceae. It is found only in Yemen. Its natural habitat is subtropical or tropical dry forests.

References

scottii
Endemic flora of Socotra
Vulnerable flora of Africa
Vulnerable flora of Asia
Taxonomy articles created by Polbot
Taxa named by Isaac Bayley Balfour